Redon, Ille-et-Vilaine is a town in Brittany, France

Redon or Rédon may also refer to:

People
Gaston Redon (1853-1921), a French architect and teacher
Jean-Claude Redon de Beaupréau (1738-1815), a French politician
Joel Redon (1961-1995), an American novelist
Laurent Rédon (b 1973), a French motor racing driver
Maxime de Redon des Chapelles (fl 1805-1838), a French writer for the stage
Odilon Redon (1840-1916), a French Symbolist painter
Philippe Redon (b 1950), a French footballer and manager
Redon, a legendary king of the Britons

Places
Redon Abbey, a former abbey located in Redon, Ille-et-Vilaine
Saint-Martin-le-Redon, a commune in Lot, France
Saint-Nicolas-de-Redon, a commune in Loire-Atlantique, France

Other uses
Treaty of Redon, a 1489 treaty between England and Brittany